Godfrey de Luci (also Godfrey de Lucy) was a medieval Bishop of Winchester.

Life
Godfrey de Luci was the second son of Richard de Luci and his wife Rohese. He had an elder brother Geoffrey, and three sisters, Maud, Alice, and Aveline.

Godfrey was dean of St. Martin le Grand in London before being appointed Archdeacon of Derby in the diocese of Lichfield about 1171. He was Archdeacon of Richmond in the diocese of York before 18 August 1184. He also held prebends in the dioceses of Exeter, Lincoln, London and Salisbury. He was also a royal justice.

Godfrey was nominated to the see of Winchester 15 September 1189 and consecrated as Bishop 22 October 1189.

Godfrey  was named the guardian of his nephews, sons of his elder brother, Geoffrey, but they died without heirs and the lands were divided between their sisters. In 1194, he fell out of favour with King Richard, but by the start of King John's reign he had recovered his lands.

Godfrey died on 11 September 1204 or on 12 September.

Citations

References
 British History Online Archdeacons of Richmond accessed on 2 November 2007
 British History Online Bishops of Winchester accessed on 2 November 2007
 
 

Bishops of Winchester
Archdeacons of Derby
Archdeacons of Richmond
Anglo-Normans
1204 deaths
Burials at Winchester Cathedral
12th-century births
12th-century English Roman Catholic bishops
13th-century English Roman Catholic bishops

Year of birth unknown